Mohamed Halifa Soulé (born 12 November 1990) is a Comorian international footballer who plays for Ayia Napa FC, as an attacking midfielder.

Career
Soulé has played club football for L'Entente SSG, Albi, Béziers and OFI Crete. On 30 December 2016, Soulé signed a 6-month contract with Superleague Greece club Veria.

He made his international debut for Comoros in 2011.

References

1990 births
Living people
French sportspeople of Comorian descent
French footballers
Comorian footballers
Comoros international footballers
Entente SSG players
US Albi players
AS Béziers (2007) players
OFI Crete F.C. players
Veria F.C. players
Association football midfielders
French expatriate footballers
Comorian expatriate footballers
French expatriate sportspeople in Greece
Comorian expatriate sportspeople in Greece
Expatriate footballers in Greece
Ayia Napa FC players